The New York Breeders' Futurity is an American Thoroughbred horse race run annually since 1963 at Finger Lakes Race Track in Farmington, New York. A premier event for two-year-old horses bred in New York State, the race is a six furlong sprint contested on dirt. It currently offers a purse of $200,000 added.

Historical notes
The 1963 inaugural running was won by Prophet Wise under jockey José Olivares who would win the race again in 1967 and 1969. A 2005 inductee into the Finger Lakes Racing Hall of Fame, through 2019 his three wins is a record that has been tied but not broken.

For 1966 only, the race was split into two classes, one for colts and geldings and the other for fillies.

In 1990 a large field resulted in the race being run in two divisions.

Rudy Rodriguez rode By the Light to victory in the 2007 Futurity. Seven years later he won again, this time as the trainer of Good Luck Gus. Rodriguez earned his third win overall when he trained Dream Bigger to win the 2019 running.

Records
Speed  record:
 1:09.85 @ 6 furlongs: Classic Pack (2005)

Most wins by a jockey:
 3 – José Olivares (1963, 1967, 1969)
 3 – Frank Lovato Jr. (1980, 1981, 1997)
 3 – Kevin Whitley (1983, 1985, 1990)
 3 – John Davila Jr. (1998, 2010, 2011)

Most wins by a trainer:
 6 – Daniel H. Conway Sr. (1964, 1966, 1967, 1969, 1970, 1973)

Most wins by an owner:
 4 – Mrs. Thomas M. Waller (1965, 1969, 1970, 1973)
 4 – Assunta Louis Farms (Dominick J. Deluke)  (1974, 1976, 1978, 1979)

Winners

References

Horse races in New York (state)
Finger Lakes Race Track
Flat horse races for two-year-olds
Restricted stakes races in the United States
1963 establishments in New York (state)
Recurring sporting events established in 1963
1963 in American sports